The 1964 UCI Track Cycling World Championships were the World Championship for track cycling. They took place in Paris, France from 8 to 13 September 1964. Nine events were contested, 7 for men (3 for professionals, 4 for amateurs) and 2 for women.

Medal summary

Medal table

See also
 1964 UCI Road World Championships

References

Track cycling
UCI Track Cycling World Championships by year
International cycle races hosted by France
Uci
1964 in track cycling